The Spanish ironclad Sagunto was a wooden-hulled armored frigate built for the Royal Spanish Navy in the 1860s and 1870s. She was originally built as a large ship of the line, but was converted into a central-battery ironclad while still under construction. She was stricken from the naval register in 1891.

Design and description

She displaced  and was fitted with a ram bow. Her crew consisted of 554 officers and enlisted men.

The ship was fitted with a pair of imported Forges et Chantiers de la Méditerranée compound-expansion steam engines that drove one propeller shaft using steam provided by eight cylindrical boilers.

The frigate's main battery was originally intended to consist of thirty  smoothbore guns mounted on the broadside, but she was completed with eight single Armstrong-Whitworth  rifled muzzle-loading (RML) guns on the main deck arranged on the central-battery principle. On the upper deck were two Trubia  RML guns, one on each broadside, and another in the forecastle as the forward chase gun. By 1883, the Trubia guns had been replaced by Palliser RMLs of the same caliber.

Sagunto had a complete wrought iron waterline belt of  armor plates. Above the belt, the guns, except for the chase gun, were protected by an equal thickness of armor. The ends of the ship and the deck were unarmored.

Construction and service
Segunto, named for the ancient Siege of Saguntum, was ordered in December 1862 as the 100-gun ship of the line Principe Don Alfonso from the Royal Shipyard of Esteiro in Ferrol. The ship was laid down on 21 March 1863 and she was renamed Segunto in 1868 while she was being converted into a central-battery ironclad. The ship was launched on 26 April 1869 and commissioned on 1 February 1877.

Footnotes

References
 
 

 

1869 ships
Ships built in Spain
Ironclad warships of the Spanish Navy